Newtonia Township is an inactive township in Newton County, in the U.S. state of Missouri.

Newtonia Township derives its name from the community of Newtonia, Missouri.

References

Townships in Missouri
Townships in Newton County, Missouri